Glyn Tarell is a valley and a community in the county of Powys, Wales, and the historic county of Brecknockshire. It is in the Brecon Beacons National Park and at the northern edge of the Brecon Beacons mountains.

Description

The valley is on the A470 road which runs along the eponymous valley of the River Tarell.

The Taff Trail runs through the valley. The administrative area of the community extends over a wide area of sparsely populated land, and extends south beyond the watershed to include the highest part of the River Taff and the Beacons Reservoir. Much of its northern boundary is formed by the River Usk. The peak Pen y Fan (886 m) is at the eastern boundary of the community. The main (but small) villages in the Community are Libanus and Llanspyddid.

In 2011 the population of Glyn Tarell was 633, with 14.7% of them able to speak Welsh.

(Glyn Tarell is 32 miles (51 km) from Cardiff and 146 miles (235 km) from London.)

Governance
Glyn Tarell has a community council of up to nine elected or co-opted community councillors.

The community is included in the Talybont-on-Usk electoral ward, which chooses one county councillor for Powys County Council.

See also
List of localities in Wales by population

References

External links

 
Communities in Powys